The 1982 college football season may refer to:

 1982 NCAA Division I-A football season
 1982 NCAA Division I-AA football season
 1982 NCAA Division II football season
 1982 NCAA Division III football season
 1982 NAIA Division I football season
 1982 NAIA Division II football season